Alan Lorber is an American music arranger, record producer, and composer.

References

 

Record producers from New York (state)
Living people
Year of birth missing (living people)
Place of birth missing (living people)
American music arrangers
American male composers